The 2003 South African Figure Skating Championships were held in Cape Town on 13–18 October 2002. Skaters competed in the disciplines of men's and ladies' singles at the senior, novice, and pre-novice levels. There was also a junior and juvenile ladies' competition.

Senior results

Men

Ladies

External links
 Results

South African Figure Skating Championships, 2003
South African Figure Skating Championships